Johanna Kirsch (1856-1907) was a German painter known for her portrait and genre paintings.

Biography
Kirsch was born in 1856 in Chemnitz, Germany. From 1883 to 1892 she studied at the Berlin Academy. Kirsch exhibited her work at the Woman's Building at the 1893 World's Columbian Exposition in Chicago, Illinois. Kirsch also exhibited her art at the Berlin Academy and the Munich Glass Palace.

Kirsch died in 1907 in Munich.

References

External links
 images of Kirsch's work on ArtNet

1856 births
1907 deaths
German women painters
19th-century German women artists
19th-century German painters